Assam State Film (Finance and Development) Corporation Ltd. (ASFFDC) is an organization undertaken by Government of Assam which aims in developing and promoting the legacy of Assamese cinema. It was incorporated on 4 September 1974 under Companies Act 1956  by  the  Government of Assam.

ASFFDC co-produced several Assamese films in recent years in joined venture with other production houses which includes Jahnu Barua's Baandhon (2012), Rajni Basumatary's Raag (2014) among others.

Work 
ASFFDC provides financial assistance and logistics to Assamese filmmakers by advancing loans, subsidies, grants etc. or by extending financial assistance in any other manner. It also opened the first film archive and film museum North East India, Jonakee.

ASFFDC started producing Assamese films in 2000 with its first release Nisiddha Nadi. However its second production was released in 2012, after a gap of 12 years. Since then it has been actively co-producing several Assamese films.

Produced Films

Released Films

References 

Cinema of Assam
Organisations based in Assam
State agencies of Assam
Organizations established in 1974
Film organisations in India
1974 establishments in Assam